Treniere Moser (born Treniere Clement October 27, 1981 in Stow, Ohio) is an American track and field athlete specializing in middle-distance races. She is a five-time outdoor champion (2005, 2006, 2007 and 2013) at 1500 metres, along with a 2006 indoor championship. As national champion, she represented the US at the 2005 and 2007 World Championships, neither time making the final. At the 2006 IAAF World Cup, she finished eighth and the 2006 World Indoor Championships she finished seventh.

Running career

Collegiate
Clement studied and ran competitively at Georgetown University. At Georgetown, she finished second in the 1500m at the NCAA Women's Outdoor Track and Field Championships her senior year.  Prior to that she attended Stow-Munroe Falls High School. Clement turned professional in 2004.

Nike Oregon Project (2013-present)
She joined the Nike Oregon Project in 2013, after which she set personal bests at nearly every distance. She won her fourth US Outdoor 1500m title in 2013, and ran at the World Indoor Championships during the 2014 indoor season. The following year, Moser placed 6th in a tactical final of the 2015 US Outdoor Championships Women's 1500m.

Personal Bests

Competition record

US Outdoor Championship Results

Medal Record

References

1981 births
Living people
American female middle-distance runners
African-American female track and field athletes
People from Stow, Ohio
Sportspeople from Ohio
Track and field athletes from Ohio
World Athletics Championships athletes for the United States
Georgetown University alumni
Georgetown Hoyas women's track and field athletes
World Athletics record holders (relay)
USA Outdoor Track and Field Championships winners
USA Indoor Track and Field Championships winners
21st-century African-American sportspeople
21st-century African-American women
20th-century African-American people
20th-century African-American women